Acrothamnus hookeri, commonly known as the mountain beardheath, is a flowering plant in the family Ericaceae and grows in subalpine regions of southeastern Australia. It is a small upright shrub with oblong-shaped leaves and white flowers.

Description

Taxonomy
Acrothamnus hookeri was first formally described in 2005 by Christopher John Quinn and the description was published in Australian Systematic Botany.

Distribution and habitat
Mountain beardheath grows in montane forest, in heath on wet rocky soils and woodland in New South Wales, Australian Capital Territory and Victoria.

References

Epacridoideae
Ericales of Australia
Flora of New South Wales
Plants described in 1854
Flora of Victoria (Australia)